Paschiodes okuensis is a moth in the family Crambidae. It was described by Koen V. N. Maes in 2000. It is found in Cameroon.

References

Moths described in 2000
Pyraustinae